Robert Patsy Sacchi (March 27, 1932 – June 23, 2021) was an Italian-American character actor who, since the 1970s, was known for his close resemblance to Humphrey Bogart.  He appeared in many films and TV shows playing either Bogart or a character who happens to look and sound like him.  He was best known for his role in the 1980 film The Man with Bogart's Face.

Early life
Sacchi was born in Rome on March 27, 1932.  His father, Alberto, worked as a carpenter; his mother was Marietta (D’Urbano).  They immigrated to the United States when Sacchi was an infant, and settled in The Bronx.  He attended Cardinal Hayes High School, where his friends and neighbors first noted his physical resemblance to Humphrey Bogart.  He studied business and finance at Iona College, before obtaining a master's degree from New York University.

Career
Sacchi's first three film credits in The French Sex Murders, Pulp, and Across 110th Street (all released in 1972) saw him play roles not connected with Bogart.  He began playing Bogart during the early 1970s, starting with Woody Allen's touring comedy Play It Again, Sam.  He also played the role while touring college campuses.

Sacchi played the title role in the 1980 comedy The Man with Bogart's Face (also titled Sam Marlow, Private Eye) about a private investigator who gets plastic surgery to take after Bogart.  He starred alongside Franco Nero, Michelle Phillips, Olivia Hussey, Yvonne De Carlo, Mike Mazurki, and George Raft (making his final film appearance).  Writing in The New York Times, Tom Buckley was of the opinion that Sacchi "shows considerable acting skill in the title role, although his hopes for future employment in films would seem to be limited".  In spite of this prediction, he went on to gain more roles as Bogart.  These included Phil Collins's music video in 1990 titled "I Wish It Would Rain Down", as well as Sacchi's one-man show called Bogey’s Back.  He also played Bogart in Fantasy Island (1981), Sledge Hammer! (1987), and the Cybill episode "In Her Dreams" (1997).  He later recounted how he "never thought Bogie was too terrific-looking", adding that "like most kids at the time, I wanted to look like Gregory Peck".

During the 1990s, Sacchi played minor roles in Die Hard 2 (1990) and The Naked Truth (1992).  In a notable episode of Tales from the Crypt entitled "You, Murderer" in 1995 (season 6 episode 15), Sacchi only provided the voice of a character who looks like Bogart.  Computer manipulated stock footage of Bogart provided the visuals. Also in 1995, he had a television role in the Pointman episode titled "The Psychic".  One of his final film credits came in 1999 with Blast From The Past.

Personal life
Sacchi had six children from his first marriage: Robert Jr., Barbara, Felicia, Maria, Lisa, and Anthony.  His second marriage was to Peruvian artist Angela De Hererera.  They remained married for 51 years until his death.  Together, they had two children: Trish, and John who worked as a film producer.

Sacchi died on June 23, 2021, at Barlow Respiratory Hospital in Sherman Oaks, Los Angeles.  He was 89, and suffered from a brief illness prior to his death.

Selected filmography

Film
The French Sex Murders (Casa d'appuntamento) (1972) – Inspector Fontaine
Pulp (1972) – The Bogeyman
Across 110th Street (1972) – Hood
Shhh (1975)
The Man with Bogart's Face (1980) – Sam Marlow
 E. Nick: A Legend in His Own Mind (1984) — Mr. Trowel
Funland (1987) – Mario DiMauro / Bogie
Another Chance (1989) – Mickey 'Bogart' Pinco
Cold Heat (1989) – Mikey Musconi
Die Hard 2 (1990) – Engineer #3
The Naked Truth (1992) – Gesundheim II
The Erotic Adventures of the Three Musketeers – Athos
Blast From The Past (1999) – Bogart DJ

Television
Fantasy Island (1981) – Humphrey Bogart
 Cadence 3 (Episode dated March 9, 1983) – Himself
 1983 Vorsicht Musik! (TV Series, 1983) — Himself
Sledge Hammer! (1987) – Bogie
 Simon & Simon (episode The Merry Adventures of Robert Hood, 1988) — Cyril Linehart
 Katts and Dog (episode Murder She Sang, 1989) — Nick McGee
Der Stoff, aus dem die Filme sind (1989) - by German film maker Christoph Felder
 Burke's Law (episode Who Killed Nick Hazard?, 1994) — Nick Hazard
 Tales from the Crypt (episode You, Murderer, 1995) — Lou Spinelli (voice)
 Pointman (episode The Psychic, 1995) — Humphrey Bogart
 Cybill (episode In Her Dreams, 1997) — Humphrey Bogart Look-Alike
 Oh Baby (episode Sitting on Babies, 1999) — Detective #1
 Biography (episode Humphrey Bogart, 2003) — Himself - Actor and Historian

Music Videos
 Phil Collins: "I Wish It Would Rain Down" — Humphrey Bogart

Songs
"Jungle Queen" (1982)
"Casablanca" (1982)

References

External links
 

1932 births
2021 deaths
American male actors
Iona University alumni
Italian emigrants to the United States
New York University alumni
Male actors from Rome
People from the Bronx